Agnes of Burgundy (or Agnes de Macon; died 10 November 1068) was Duchess of Aquitaine by marriage to Duke William V and Countess of Anjou by marriage to Count Geoffrey II. She served as regent of the Duchy of Aquitaine during the minority of her son from 1039 until 1044. 
She was a daughter of Otto-William, Count of Burgundy and Ermentrude de Roucy and a member of the House of Ivrea.

First marriage: Duchess of Aquitaine
In 1019, she married Duke William V of Aquitaine by whom she had three children: William VII, Duke of Aquitaine, William VIII, Duke of Aquitaine and Agnes, Holy Roman Empress. William died on 31 January 1030, leaving his widow and their three young children, plus the three surviving children from his first two marriages. While married to William, Agnes gave many gifts to the abbey of Cluny.

Second marriage: Countess of Anjou
After her husband's death, Agnes lost her influence at the court of Poitiers since her sons were not heirs. In order for her to regain her position and ensure a future for her children, Agnes had to remarry. Thus she married Geoffrey II, Count of Anjou in 1032, which was an attractive offer because his father was the powerful Fulk III, Count of Anjou.

In 1033, Geoffrey's troops invaded Poitou with the support of Agnes. William VI, Duke of Aquitaine, the new Count of Poitou, was captured in March. He was released only in 1036 against a large ransom and he died in 1038 without children. The county then returned to his brother, Agnes' stepson Odo, who was already Duke of Gascony. He went to war against Agnes, her husband and sons. Odo was killed at the battle at Mauzé.

Regency
The  succeeding Count of Poitou was Agnes's son, Peter, who took the name of William VII Aigret. Being too young, his mother governed territories in his place from 1039 to 1044 and indeed it even seems the government itself, without her husband. When she transmitted the power to William, she married and took the opportunity to give his second son, Geoffrey Guy the duchy of Gascony, by marrying an heiress. Agnes then joined Geoffrey in Anjou and although she may not have actively participated in the government, certainly had some influence on him.

Agnes and Geoffrey stayed in Germany at the imperial court, so her daughter Agnes could marry Henry III, Holy Roman Emperor. They then bonded with the imperial couple, during a trip to Italy where they participated in the council of Sutri, filing and inducting two popes Pope Clement II, who was quick to crown the emperor and empress. After a pilgrimage to Monte Garaño, the couple went back to Poitou in 1047 where they founded Sainte-Marie-des-Dames. Between 1047 and 1049, Agnes founded the abbey of Saint Nicolas de Poitou.

Separation from Geoffrey
Between 1049 and 1052, Agnes and Geoffrey separated. The reasons are varied: the most logical is the absence of children, however the council of Reims in 1049 condemned certain marriages as incestuous and judged them to part; in addition, Geoffrey went to war against the King of France who appreciated the little freedom from war that would take his vassal to Germany (it seems that Geoffrey had to swear allegiance to the emperor and to no longer depend on the King of France) and it is very possible that the King imposed on his vanquished vassal that he should  divorce his wife. Indeed, Agnes also influenced her husband, but she came from Burgundy and had retained strong links with her homeland, so it may be that it was Agnes who wanted the divorce.

Later life
Still, Agnes returned to the court of Poitiers and her son William over  whom she had much influence. A war soon broke out between Anjou and Poitou, which saw a victory for Geoffrey in 1053. This would have probably never happened if Agnes had not divorced Geoffrey. In 1058 William left for another war against his former stepfather Count of Anjou, probably because Geoffrey gave the dowry of Agnes to his new wife, Adelaide. William was on the verge of winning when he died of an illness in 1058.

He was succeeded by his brother, Geoffrey Guy, who took the dynastic name of William VIII. The young count had remained close to Geoffrey because he was the only father figure he knew and he reconciled with Anjou. But only during Geoffrey's lifetime, in fact, after Geoffrey's death, William did not hesitate to attack his heirs and assume control of Saintonge from 1062. Agnes, despite her retirement, was still very active and did not hesitate to travel throughout Poitou to participate in donations or simply see her son at the court of Poitiers. In 1062, Agnes with her daughter, Empress Agnes, petitioned Pope Alexander II to place St. Nicholaus of Poitou under apostolic protection. Agnes died on 10 November 1068. She is buried at St. Nicolas de Poitiers.

See also
 County of Burgundy
 Dukes of Burgundy family tree

References

Sources

|-

|-

990s births
1068 deaths
11th-century French people
11th-century Italian nobility
Countesses of Anjou
Duchesses of Aquitaine
11th-century women rulers
Anscarids
House of Poitiers
11th-century French women
11th-century Italian women